Salamansa is a village in the northeastern part of the island of Sao Vicente, Cape Verde. It is situated on the north coast, approximately 5 km northeast of the city centre of Mindelo. In 2010 its population was 1,179. Salamansa is a fishing village with a long sandy beach.

In popular culture
Cais-do-Sodré té Salamansa, a collection of short stories by Orlanda Amarílis published in 1974
Salamansa, a song by Cesária Évora from the album Distino di Belita (1990)
Areia de Salamansa, a song by Cesária Évora from the album Cesária (1995)
Pic Nic na Salamansa, a song by Cesária Évora from the album São Vicente di Longe (2001)

References

External links

Photo of Salamansa on ecaboverde.com
Salamansa on mindelo.info 

Villages and settlements in São Vicente, Cape Verde